Ben Weaver (born 1980) is an American singer-songwriter.

Early life
Weaver was born in Eugene, Oregon but grew up mostly in St. Paul, Minnesota.  He has a worldwide following, though his popularity is strongest in his native Midwest of the United States.

Weaver grew up in a musical household and always expected to make music his life. After one year of college he dropped out and began traveling, which provided experiences that would feed his songwriting.

Career 
Weaver's first album, El Camino Blues, was released in 1999 and featured Greg Brown, with input from Tony Glover. Weaver then undertook his first tour in support of the album.  His second album, "Living in the Ground," was recorded in one five-hour-session and featured Bo Ramsey. His third album, Hollerin' at a Woodpecker, released in 2002, was critically acclaimed in Britain and the United States, including being named No.3 Americana album of the year by Mojo magazine. The success laid the ground for the international release of his fourth album, Stories Under Nails, in 2004, followed by his first international tour. On subsequent tours Weaver has appeared with many artists including The Waifs and Kristin Hersh.

His 2010 album, Mirepoix and Smoke, was inspired by the time he spent working in a Minneapolis restaurant after taking a break from recording and touring in 2009. He is also a poet and fiction writer whose short story, "Humanesque," was included in the 2009 anthology Amplified: Fiction from Leading Alt-Country, Indie Rock, Blues and Folk Musicians, and whose poem "Devastations" won the 2009 What Light Grand Jury Prize.

An avid bicyclist, Weaver has used his bike as his transport method for touring.

Discography 
 1999: El Camino Blues (Unit Three Records)
 2002: Hollerin' at a Woodpecker (30/30 Industries)
 2003: Living in the Ground (30/30 Industries)
 2004: Stories Under Nails (Fugawee Bird Records)
 2007: Paper Sky (Fugawee Bird Records / Glitterhouse Records)
 2008: The Ax in the Oak (Bloodshot Records / Glitterhouse Records)
 2010: Mirepoix and Smoke (Bloodshot Records)
 2014: I Would Rather Be A Buffalo (Hymie's Records)
 2017: Sees Like a River (Ben Weaver)

References

External links 
 Ben Weaver
 Ben Weaver at Bloodshot Records
 

1980 births
American male singer-songwriters
Living people
Musicians from Eugene, Oregon
Musicians from Saint Paul, Minnesota
Bloodshot Records artists
Singer-songwriters from Oregon
Singer-songwriters from Minnesota
21st-century American singers
21st-century American male singers